IDE, iDE, or Ide may refer to:

Organisations
 Institut für Dokumentologie und Editorik, a German think tank for the application of digital methods on historical documents
 Institute of Developing Economies, a semi-governmental research institute in Japan
 Institute for Democratic Education, founded by Yaacov Hecht
 Instituto de Desenvolvimento Educacional, a Brazilian institution linked with Fundação Getúlio Vargas
 International Development Enterprises, a development NGO based in Denver, Colorado
 Party of Internet Democracy, a political party in Hungary

Science and technology

Biology and medicine
 Ide (fish), a freshwater fish
 Intact dilation and extraction, a form of abortion
 Insulin-degrading enzyme, Insulysin, an enzyme
 Infectious disease epidemiology, the study of the patterns of communicable diseases at the population level
 Investigational Device Exemption, a US Food and Drug Administration regulatory status

Chemistry
 Suffix -ide for some molecules in the IUPAC nomenclature of inorganic chemistry

Computing
 Integrated development environment, a software application for software development
 Integrated Drive Electronics, a computer hardware bus for disk drives, retroactively termed Parallel ATA

Places
 Ide, Devon, a village in England
 Ide, Kyoto, a town in Japan

Greek mythology
Ida (mother of Minos), daughter of Corybas, the wife of Lycastus king of Crete, and the mother of the "second" king Minos of Crete
Ida (nurse of Zeus), who along with her sister Adrasteia, nursed Zeus on Crete

Abbreviations
 Sometimes used to refer to Diversity, Equity, and Inclusion, an organizational equality training term

People
 Samuel Krafsur (1913–1983), (KGB codename)
 Ide Schelling (born 1998), Dutch cyclist

Given name
 Íde, a feminine name of Gaelic origin

Surname
 Charlie Ide (born 1988), English footballer
, Japanese footballer
 Henry Clay Ide (1844–1921), American commissioner to Samoa and the Philippines
, Japanese shogi player
, Japanese triathlete
, Japanese speed skater
, Japanese screenwriter
 William B. Ide (1796–1852), author of the California Republic's proclamation of independence from Mexico
 Yuji Ide (born 1975), Japanese racing driver
 Yasunori Ide, Japanese anime creator

See also
 Eid (disambiguation)
 Ides (disambiguation)

Japanese-language surnames